Celorico may refer to the following places in Portugal:

 Celorico de Basto, a municipality in the district of Braga
 Celorico da Beira, a municipality in the district of Guarda